Mary Celine Fasenmyer, RSM (October 4, 1906, Crown, Pennsylvania – December 27, 1996, Erie, Pennsylvania) was an American mathematician and Catholic religious sister. She is most noted for her work on hypergeometric functions and linear algebra.

Biography 
Fasenmyer grew up in Pennsylvania's oil country, and displayed mathematical talent in high school. For ten years after her graduation she taught and studied at Mercyhurst College in Erie, where she joined the Sisters of Mercy. She pursued her mathematical studies in Pittsburgh and the University of Michigan, obtaining her doctorate in 1946 under the direction of Earl Rainville, with a dissertation entitled Some Generalized Hypergeometric Polynomials.

After earning her Ph.D., Fasenmyer published two papers which expanded on her doctorate work. These would be further elaborated by Doron Zeilberger and Herbert Wilf into "WZ theory", which allowed computerized proof of many combinatorial identities. After this, she returned to Mercyhurst to teach and did not engage in further research.

Fasenmyer died in 1996.

"Sister Celine's" method
Fasenmyer is most remembered for the method that bears her name, first described in her Ph.D. thesis concerning recurrence relations in hypergeometric series. The thesis demonstrated a purely algorithmic method to find recurrence relations satisfied by sums of terms of a hypergeometric polynomial, and requires only the series expansions of the polynomial. The beauty of her method is that it lends itself readily to computer automation. The work of Wilf and Zeilberger generalized the algorithm and established its correctness.

The hypergeometric polynomials she studied are called Sister Celine's polynomials.

References

Publications

External links

 
 

Herbert Wilf and Lily Yen talk to Sister Celine (1993)

"Sister Mary Celine Fasenmyer", Biographies of Women Mathematicians, Agnes Scott College

1906 births
1996 deaths
20th-century American educators
20th-century American mathematicians
20th-century American Roman Catholic nuns
Mathematical analysts
Mercyhurst University alumni
People from Erie, Pennsylvania
Sisters of Mercy
Horace H. Rackham School of Graduate Studies alumni
American women mathematicians
Catholics from Pennsylvania
20th-century women mathematicians
20th-century American women educators